North Carolina's 50th Senate district is one of 50 districts in the North Carolina Senate. It has been represented by Republican Kevin Corbin since 2021.

Geography
Since 2023, the district has covered all of Cherokee, Clay, Macon, Graham, Swain, Jackson, and Transylvania counties, as well as most of Haywood County. The district overlaps with the 118th, 119th, and 120th state house districts.

District officeholders since 2003

Election results

2022

2020

2018

2016

2014

2012

2010

2008

2006

2004

2002

References

North Carolina Senate districts
Cherokee County, North Carolina
Clay County, North Carolina
Macon County, North Carolina
Graham County, North Carolina
Swain County, North Carolina
Jackson County, North Carolina
Transylvania County, North Carolina
Haywood County, North Carolina